Arp 256 is a pair of interacting spiral galaxies located in the constellation of Cetus. Arp 256 (also Arp 256S) refers to the southern galaxy; the northern galaxy is Arp 256N.

References

External links

Barred spiral galaxies
256
Cetus (constellation)
Interacting galaxies